The Portrait (German: Das Bildnis, French: L'image) is a 1923 Austrian-French silent drama film directed by Jacques Feyder and starring Arlette Marchal, Malcolm Tod and Victor Vina. Future star Vilma Bánky appears in a small role.

It as shot at the Rosenhügel Studios in Vienna. The film's sets were designed by the art director Alexander Ferenczy.

Cast
 Arlette Marchal as Madeleine Fontevrault "das Bildnis" 
 Malcolm Tod as Ingenieur 
 Jean-Victor Marguerite as Seminarist 
 Victor Vina as Diamantenschleifer 
 Fred Louis Lerch as Maler 
 Armand Dufour as Madeleine's Ehemann 
 Fred Hennings as Der Astronom 
 Suzy Vernon as Freundin 
 Mary Zaile as Die Kusine 
 Vilma Bánky
 Eugen Jensen
 Ria Jászonyi
 Victor Kutschera

References

Bibliography
 Robert Von Dassanowsky. Austrian Cinema: A History. McFarland, 2005.

External links

1923 films
Austrian silent feature films
Austrian drama films
Films directed by Jacques Feyder
1923 drama films
Austrian black-and-white films
French drama films
Films shot at Rosenhügel Studios
French silent feature films
Silent drama films
1920s French films
1920s German-language films
German-language French films